John Kane (born 27 October 1945) is a British actor and writer.

Career
An associate actor with the Royal Shakespeare Company, he played Puck in Peter Brook's acclaimed production of A Midsummer Night's Dream alongside Ben Kingsley, Alan Howard and Frances de la Tour, before turning to comedy script writing. He began writing for Terry Scott's sketch show Scott On, before taking over the reins on a project for Terry Scott and comic actress June Whitfield, which began as Happy Ever After and later turned into the longer-running series Terry and June, for which he wrote the entire first series and much of the subsequent run. His TV acting credits include Tommy—an adult with learning difficulties—in the 1974 Doctor Who serial Planet of the Spiders.

Continuing to work as an actor with the RSC, he also created sitcoms Me and My Girl (1984–88) with Richard O'Sullivan and Tim Brooke-Taylor, All in Good Faith (1985–88) with Richard Briers and Aztec drama The Feathered Serpent (1976–78). He also wrote for, among others, Never the Twain, Smuggler, Rings on Their Fingers and wrote the "Six Napoleons" episode of The Adventures of Sherlock Holmes, with Jeremy Brett in the title role.

Turning to the stage, he wrote the RSC's adaptation of Wizard of Oz, West End Cole Porter tribute A Swell Party and the words and music in 2005 for The Canterville Ghost at the Southwark Playhouse. He also wrote the television film The Vamp starring Shelley Winters, children's cartoon Britt Allcroft's Magic Adventures of Mumfie, and won a CableACE Award for his screenplay Daisies in December starring Joss Ackland. He collaborated with composer David Bass on a children's opera Kids Court which was premiered in Cambridge, Massachusetts in 2007 by the North Cambridge Family Opera Company. He continues to work as a stage and screen actor.

Personal life
He has three children, one with his wife, and subsequently two children with opera singer Alison Warner: Simon Kane and Susy Kane. Simon and Susy have followed in his footsteps, acting and writing.

John now lives in the village of Puissalicon, in the Hérault region of southern France, where he was interviewed in 2010 for the DVD of his Doctor Who serial, in which he discussed his life and career.

References

External links
About John Kane, North Cambridge Family Opera Company
David John Kane, TV.com
 

1945 births
British television writers
British male stage actors
Living people
Royal Shakespeare Company members
British male television actors
British male television writers